In geometry and topology, a channel or canal surface is a surface formed as the envelope of a family of spheres whose centers lie on a space curve, its directrix. If the radii of the generating spheres are constant, the canal surface is called a pipe surface. Simple examples are:

 right circular cylinder (pipe surface, directrix is a line, the axis of the cylinder)
 torus (pipe surface, directrix is a circle),
 right circular cone (canal surface, directrix is a line (the axis), radii of the spheres not constant),
 surface of revolution (canal surface, directrix is a line),

Canal surfaces play an essential role in descriptive geometry, because in case of an orthographic projection its contour curve can be drawn as the envelope of circles.
In technical area canal surfaces can be used for blending surfaces  smoothly.

Envelope of a pencil of implicit surfaces 
Given the pencil of implicit surfaces
,
two neighboring surfaces  and 
 intersect in a curve that fulfills the equations 

For the limit  one gets
.
The last equation is the reason for the following definition.
 Let  be a 1-parameter pencil of regular implicit  surfaces ( being  at least twice continuously differentiable). The surface defined by the two equations

is the envelope  of the given pencil of surfaces.

Canal surface 
The last condition means that the curvature of the curve is less than that of the corresponding sphere.
The envelope of the 1-parameter pencil of spheres 

is called a canal surface and  its directrix. If the radii are constant, it is called a pipe surface.

Parametric representation of a canal surface 
The envelope condition 

of the canal surface above is for any value of  the equation of a plane, which is orthogonal to the tangent  
 of the directrix. Hence the envelope is a collection of circles. 
This property is the key for a parametric representation of the canal surface. The center of the circle (for parameter ) has the distance 
 (see condition above)
Hence

where the vectors  and the tangent vector  form an orthonormal basis, is a parametric representation of the canal surface.

For  one gets the parametric representation of a pipe surface:

Examples 
a) The first picture shows a canal surface with
the helix  as directrix and 
the radius function . 
.
b) For the second picture the radius is constant:, i. e. the canal surface is a pipe surface.
c) For the 3. picture the pipe surface b) has parameter .
d) The 4. picture shows a pipe knot. Its directrix is a curve on a torus 
e) The 5. picture shows a Dupin cyclide (canal surface).

References

External links 
M. Peternell and H. Pottmann: Computing Rational Parametrizations of Canal Surfaces

Surfaces